The Unwin Range are a small mountain range in southwestern British Columbia, Canada, located on the eastern end of Homfray Channel.

See also
List of mountain ranges

References

Pacific Ranges